The Gulf Coast of the United States comprises the coasts of American states that are on the Gulf of Mexico.

Gulf Coast may also refer to:
 Gulf Coast (magazine), a literary magazine from Houston, Texas
 Gulf Coast of Mexico, the Gulf of Mexico from the border between Mexico and the United States to the tip of the Yucatán Peninsula
 Gulf Coast League, a rookie-level Minor League Baseball league
 Gulf Coast State College, a public college in Panama City, Florida
 Mississippi Gulf Coast, area of southern Mississippi along the Gulf Of Mexico

See also 
 Gulf (disambiguation)